Grima is a river at Barentsøya, Svalbard, which flows through the valley of Grimdalen, from Barentsjøkulen to Ginevra Bay.

References

Rivers of Svalbard
Barentsøya